The 1922 Hampton Seasiders football team was an American football team that represented Hampton Institute in the Colored Intercollegiate Athletic Association (CIAA) during the 1922 college football season. In their second year under head coach Gideon Smith, the Pirates compiled a 6–1 record and outscored opponents by a total of 52 to 25. Hampton was recognized as the 1922 black college national co-champion.

Edward L. "Red" Dabney was the team captain. William S. Parker was the assistant coach. The team played its home games at Armstrong Field on the Institute's campus in Hampton, Virginia.

Schedule

Notes

References

Hampton
Hampton Pirates football seasons
Black college football national champions
Hampton Seasiders football